The Amulet is the sixth studio album by American rock band Circa Survive, released on September 22, 2017. The Amulet is Circa Survive's first album released through Hopeless Records, after departing their previous label, Sumerian Records. As with previous Circa Survive albums, Esao Andrews created the album artwork.

Release 
In a September 2016 Reddit AMA, Anthony Green announced that a new Circa Survive album would be forthcoming. The band announced The Amulet on July 10, 2017, and the album announcement was accompanied by the first single and music video, "Lustration." The next month, they released "Rites of Investiture," with a music video made from a 1994 short film directed by Green's cousin Jonathan Michaels. The title track was released on August 30, accompanied by a video shot at a fireworks convention in Fargo, North Dakota. The last single before the album's release, "Premonition of the Hex," debuted on September 14, with a video directed by Josh Call. The video, which depicts a cult, was meant to "showcase the dangers of fundamentalism and extremism."

The band announced a co-headlining tour with Thrice, accompanied by Balance and Composure and Chon, across North America beginning in San Jose on November 2, 2017.

Track listing

Charts

Personnel 

Circa Survive
 Anthony Green – lead vocals
 Colin Frangicetto – rhythm guitar, backing vocals
 Brendan Ekstrom – lead guitar
 Nick Beard – bass guitar, backing vocals
 Steve Clifford – drums, percussion

Additional musicians
 Kenny Vasoli – guitar

Production
 Will Yip – producer, engineer, mix engineer
 Vince Ratti – mix engineer
 Ryan Smith – mastering

Design
 Esao Andrews – artwork, art direction
 Michael Lopez – album layout, art direction

References

2017 albums
Circa Survive albums
Hopeless Records albums
Albums produced by Will Yip